is a Japanese original anime television series from Aniplex, Fanworks and Sony Creative Products. This series started airing in Japan from April 3, 2021 on Tokyo MX and BS11.

Plot
Tyrannosaurus, Triceratops, and Stenonychosaurus live together in a one-room apartment. The dinosaurs experience and try to process life in every day scenarios such as working a part-time job or eating sweets. Their clashing personalities cause them to fight occasionally, but theirs is a happy life. However, as Tyrannosaurus is constantly pointing out, their happy life could end in an instant if a meteorite fell.

Characters

Tyrannosaurus is the strongest carnivorous dinosaur who likes to eat meat and sweets. Because of his stubby arms he doesn't like things which he can't do.

Triceratops is a herbivorous dinosaur who has three horns on his head. He can fall asleep anywhere, anytime. He's so bad at reading atmosphere.

Stenonychosaurus has very large brain. He likes those who give him praise but he hates exercise.

Media

Anime
This series is being produced by Fanworks. Directed by Akifumi Nonaka, script is written by Toru Hosokawa, character design by Usagimen and CHI-MEY composing the music. This anime's image song is "Aisou Ze!” by CHAI.

References

External links
 Official website 
 

Animated television series about dinosaurs
Anime with original screenplays
Aniplex
Fanworks (animation studio)
Slice of life anime and manga